The Dubai government's decision to diversify from a trade-based, oil-reliant economy to one that is service and tourism-oriented has made real estate and other developments more valuable, resulting in a property boom from 2004 to 2006. Construction on a large scale has turned Dubai into one of the fastest-growing cities in the world. There are a number of large-scale projects which are currently under construction or will be constructed in the future. Due to the heavy construction which is taking place in Dubai, 30,000 construction cranes, which are 25% of cranes worldwide, are operating in Dubai.
Due to the burst of construction, Dubai has acquired various building-related records, which include: the world's tallest tower (Burj Khalifa), the world's largest shopping mall (Dubai Mall), the world's largest fountain (The Dubai Fountain) and the world's tallest hotel (Gevora Hotel). Also under construction is Dubailand, which will be almost twice the size of the Walt Disney World Resort.

In 2009, many construction real estate projects were suspended or abandoned, due to the worsening financial crisis of 2007–2010. That has also caused property prices to fall considerably throughout the United Arab Emirates, but most notably in Dubai. A Real Estate Regulatory Agency study found that over 200 projects had been canceled between 2009 and 2011. In 2013 Prime Minister Sheikh Mohammed bin Rashid Al Maktoum created a committee to consider liquidating stalled building projects to pay off investors.

A study by economists who had access to leaked Dubai real estate data on 800,000 properties found at least $146 billion in foreign wealth invested in the Dubai property market, which is twice as much as all the real estate held in the United Kingdom by foreigners through shell companies. The study found that approximately 20% of offshore Dubai real estate is owned by Indians whereas 10% is owned by the British, and that an "a number of conflict-ridden countries and autocracies have large holdings in Dubai relative to the size of their economy." By cross-comparing the leaked data with Norwegian administrative data, the study found that 70% of the properties owned by Norwegians in Dubai were not reported in Norwegians tax returns, which raised questions about Dubai real estate investments as a form of tax evasion.

Areas in redevelopment

Port Rashid

Port Rashid (Arabic: ميناء راشد; mina'a rāšid), also referred to as Mina Rashid, is a man-made, commercial port in Dubai, the United Arab Emirates set to turned into a be Cruise Ship Port

Dubai World Trade Centre

The Dubai World Trade Centre (DWTC) (Arabic: مركز التجارة العالمي دبي) is a business complex in Dubai, United Arab Emirates, built by Sheikh Rashid bin Saeed Al Maktoum. It is located along Sheikh Zayed Road at the Trade Centre Roundabout. The complex comprises the original tower (built in 1978), eight exhibition halls, the Dubai International Convention Centre and residential apartments.

Completed developments

Burj Khalifa

The Burj Khalifa (Arabic: برج خليفة for "Khalifa Tower") is a supertall skyscraper in the "Downtown Dubai" area of Dubai, United Arab Emirates. The building is part of a huge development located at the "First Interchange" (aka "Defense round-about") along Sheikh Zayed Road at Doha Street. Skidmore, Owings & Merrill LLP (SOM) of Chicago is the lead architect, structural engineer, and mechanical engineer of the Burj. George J. Efstathiou of SOM is the Managing Partner on the project, while Adrian Smith, formerly of SOM, was the Design Partner. Third-Party Review has been performed by CBM Engineers Inc. It is the tallest structure in the world.

Several other mega-projects in various states of planning and construction may vie for the title of "tallest structure". One of Burj Khalifa's main competitors was planned for a location only  from the Burj Khalifa site.

The Burj Khalifa has been designed to be the centerpiece of a large-scale, mixed-use development that includes 30,000 homes, nine hotels such as the Burj Dubai Lake Hotel & Serviced Apartments, 2.5 hectares (6 acres) of parkland, at least 19 residential towers, the Dubai Mall, and the 12 hectare man-made Burj Dubai Lake. The  development cost about US$20 billion. The tower covers a total of two million m2 (22 million ft²) of development.

The silvery glass-sheathed concrete building restored the title of Earth's tallest structure to the Middle East — a title not held by the region since Lincoln Cathedral upset the four millennial reign of Egypt's Great Pyramid of Giza in AD 1311.

Burj Khalifa Heights, the  world's highest post office, has been opened on the 148th floor of Burj Khalifa. The development has been undertaken to celebrate the launch of AED 3 official stamp, which features picture of the building and marks its 6th anniversary.

Mall of the Emirates

The Mall of the Emirates is a shopping mall in Dubai, United Arab Emirates. It is currently owned by Majid Al Futtaim (MAF Holding) and was designed by the American architectural firm, F+A Architects.

Although it features the usual amenities for a mall (a fourteen-screen movie theater, a gaming arena, a typical variety of stores, and a soon-to-be-completed dramatic theater), its biggest claim to fame is the Middle East's first indoor ski slope, Ski Dubai. With the ski area, one of the largest in the world, the Mall of the Emirates seeks to differentiate itself from the dozen or so other newly completed malls in Dubai and the surrounding emirates.

Dubai Internet City

Dubai Internet City (DIC) is an information technology park created by the Government of Dubai as a free economic zone and a strategic base for companies targeting regional emerging markets. The economic rules of DIC allow companies to avail themselves of a number of ownership, taxation and custom related benefits which are guaranteed by law for a period of 50 years. One model of operation includes 100% foreign ownership, similar to those prevailing in other designated economic zones in the United Arab Emirates. These freedoms have led many global information technology firms, such as Microsoft, IBM, Oracle Corporation, Sun Microsystems, Cisco, HP, Nokia and Siemens, Nera Telecom, as well as UAE based companies such as i-mate, Acette, to move their regional base to the DIC. DIC is located adjacent to other industrial clusters such as Dubai Media City and Dubai Knowledge Village.

Dubai Media City

Dubai Media City (DMC) part of Dubai Holding is a tax free zone within Dubai, United Arab Emirates. It has been built by the Dubai government to boost UAE's media foothold and has become a regional hub for media organizations ranging from: news agencies, publishing, online media, advertising, production, and broadcast facilities. The ground work for infrastructure (Such as fiber optic cables) was already laid for firms to set up easily and its visa and operational procedures are relaxed for firms operating within DMC.

Dubai Festival City

Dubai Festival City is a large residential, business and entertainment development in the city of Dubai, United Arab Emirates. Touted as a "city-within-a-city", Dubai Festival City is a large mixed-use development: all elements for work, living, and leisure are contained within the project. Festival City comprise a series of residential communities, numerous hotels, malls, a golf course and other entertainment sites, and a full suite of public services, including schools.

Dubai Knowledge Village

Dubai Knowledge Village, a member of Dubai Holding subsidiary TECOM Investments, offers facilities for training and learning support activities. As a Free Zone, it offers 100% foreign ownership, 100% exemption from taxes, 100% repatriation of assets and profits and effortless visa issuance procedures. Its 400-plus clients include training centres, professional centres and HR companies.

Dubai International Financial Centre

The Dubai International Financial Centre (DIFC) is a near-shore financial hub for the MENA containing a capital market designated as a financial free zone in Dubai. It is established to create an environment for growth, progress and economic development in the UAE and the wider region by providing the needed legal and business as well as physical infrastructure benchmarked with international standards.

Dubai Healthcare City

Conceived by Sheikh Mohammed bin Rashid Al Maktoum, the vision of Dubai Healthcare City (DHCC) is to become the internationally recognized location of choice for quality healthcare and an integrated centre of excellence for clinical and wellness services, medical education and research.

Dubai Studio City

Dubai Studio City is part of Dubai Media City in Dubai, UAE. Following in the footsteps of Dubai Media City, it will cater to the production needs of the region and has plans to build movie studios like Hollywood.

Dubai Silicon Oasis

Dubai Silicon Oasis is a globally recognized free zone and an integrated technology park in Dubai, United Arab Emirates, which was launched in October 2002 by Sheikh Mohammed bin Rashid Al Maktoum, UAE Vice President, Prime Minister, & ruler of Dubai, aiming to develop a fully integrated sustainable and happy community through collaboration, innovation and technology.

Dr. Mohammed Al Zarooni was appointed Vice Chairman and CEO of Dubai Silicon Oasis Authority in 2002.

Dubai Mall 

The Dubai Mall is an enormous mall in Dubai, UAE, by Emaar Properties, as part of the 'Downtown Dubai' project. Featured attractions include the world's largest gold souk, the  Fashion Island; one of the world's largest aquariums; an Olympic-sized ice skating rink; Oasis Fountain Waterfall; WaterFront Atrium; a view of the world's tallest building, Burj Khalifa. The mall has already won five awards. It won two awards at the Retail Future Project Awards at Mapic, Cannes, in 2004, for Best Retail Development Scheme (Large), Best Use of Lighting in a Retail Environment. And the Dubai Mall brochure has won three awards at the Summit Creative Awards 2005, in Portland, Oregon; Gold award for Best Art Direction / Graphic Design, Silver award for Best 4-colour B2B Brochure, and Judges Special Recognition award.

Dubai Metro 

The Dubai Metro is a driverless, fully automated metro network in the United Arab Emirates city of Dubai. The network has two third rail collection system powered lines that both run underground in the city center and on elevated viaducts elsewhere on double tracks. The first phase of the network was built by Dubai Rapid Link (DURL) Consortium which comprises Japanese companies including Mitsubishi Heavy Industries, Mitsubishi Corporation, Obayashi Corporation, Kajima Corporation and the Turkish company Yapi Merkezi. The Dubai Metro is operated by the Dubai Roads and Transport Authority. The Dubai Metro system is the longest fully automated rail system in the world. Completion of the first section of the system finished and was inaugurated on 2009. Plans for the Dubai Metro began under the directive of Dubai Ruler Sheikh Mohammed bin Rashid Al Maktoum who expected Dubai's other projects to attract 15 million visitors by 2010. This combined with Dubai's rapidly growing population expected to reach 3 million by 2017 and severe traffic congestion necessitated the building of an urban rail system to provide additional capacity to public transportation, relieve motor traffic, and provide infrastructure for additional development.

Dubai Opera

The Dubai Opera House is a state-of-the-art cultural centre in The Opera District in Downtown Dubai, accommodating an opera house with a 2,000 seating capacity. It was developed by Emaar Properties to host a variety of performances and events including theatre, opera, ballet, concerts, conferences, and exhibitions. Its plans were announced by Sheikh Mohammed bin Rashid Al Maktoum in March 2012 and it was completed in 2016. It opened on 31 August 2016 with a performance by Plácido Domingo.

Notable building structures under construction

Pentominium 

The Pentominium is a supertall skyscraper under construction in Dubai; however, the construction has been halted since July, 2012, due to lack of finances. It is designed by architects Aedas and is receiving funding from Trident International Holdings. When completed, the building will stand at 516 m (1,693 ft) tall, with 120 overground floors. Upon completion, it will become the tallest residential building in the world and one of the tallest buildings in the world.

Marina 101 

Developments under construction

Downtown Dubai

Downtown Dubai is the large scale development project, located at the "First Interchange" along Sheikh Zayed Road at Financial Centre Road (previously known as Doha Street).

Dubai Maritime City

Dubai Maritime City (DMC) is a multipurpose maritime zone. It is the world's first purpose-built maritime centre and is a member of the Dubai World group of companies. Maritime city is expected to be fully operational by 2012. Infrastructure for the Industrial Precinct of the project is set to be 85 percent complete in 2009, while groundwork for the Commercial Precinct is at 65 per cent and road work is in the final stages.

Dubai Marina 

Dubai Marina is a district in the heart of what has recently become known as 'new Dubai', in Dubai, United Arab Emirates, at Interchange 5 between Jebel Ali Port and the area which hosts Dubai Internet City, Dubai Media City and the American University in Dubai. The first phase of this project has been completed.

The marina is entirely man-made and has been developed by the real estate development firm Emaar Properties of the United Arab Emirates. It is claimed that, upon completion, it will be the world's largest man-made marina. The current largest man-made marina in the world is Marina del Rey in Los Angeles County, California, United States.

Jumeirah Lake Towers Free Zone

The Jumeirah Lake Towers Free Zone is a huge development in Dubai, United Arab Emirates, which consists of 79 towers being constructed along the edges of four artificial lakes (Lake Almas West, Lake Almas East, Lake Elucio, and Lake Allure) as well as the JLT Embankment of 8 tower facing Jumeirah Islands. The lakes (which are about 3 metres deep) will be completely filled by end of 2009.  The total area covered by the lakes, waterways and landscaping will be 730,000 square metres. The towers will range in height from 35 to 45 floors, except for the centerpiece, which will contain 66 floors. The tallest tower and the centerpiece of the entire complex, Almas Tower, will be situated on its own island between Lake Almas West and Lake Almas East. All residential towers will be placed in clusters of three, making the areas easier to navigate when mail is distributed.

Business Bay

Business Bay is a central business district under construction in Downtown Dubai, United Arab Emirates. The project features numerous skyscrapers located in an area where the Dubai Creek has been dredged and extended. The Business Bay will have upwards of 230 buildings, attracting commercial and residential developments.

Business Bay extends from Ras Al Khor to Sheikh Zayed Road. It is located for international trade as one end of the development touches Sheikh Zayed Road with its office towers housing international firms and the financial institutions of the Dubai International Financial Center. International hotels such as the Emirates Towers and Shangri-La are also on Sheikh Zayed Road. On the Creek side, Business Bay is next to the Dubai Festival Center and is in proximity to Dubai International Airport.

Dubai Sports City, Dubailand 

The Dubai Sports City is an entire sports city currently being constructed in Dubai, United Arab Emirates. The city will consist of apartment buildings as well as several sports facilities. The first structures are due to open in late 2007. The main sports structure will be the 60,000-seat, multi-purpose outdoor stadium. This stadium will be used for athletics, football, and rugby union. Other venues include a 25,000-seat cricket ground, a 10,000-seat indoor arena, a 5,000-seat field hockey stadium, and an 18-hole golf course designed by Ernie Els.

Dubai Autodrome, Dubailand 

The Dubai Autodrome is an FIA sanctioned 5.39 km motorsports circuit located in Dubai Motor City, Dubai, United Arab Emirates. The venue hosted the December 2005 A1 Grand Prix and has been proposed as a Formula One venue.

Dubai World Central 

At the heart of Dubai World Central is the Dubai World Central International Airport, the world's largest passenger and cargo hub, ten times larger than Dubai International Airport and Dubai Cargo Village combined. World Central is the world's first truly integrated logistics platform, with all transport modes, logistics and value added services, including manufacturing and assembly, in a single bonded and Free Zone environment. Dubai World Central (not just the international airport) will have a total of 100,000 parking slots for automobile vehicles for its employees, Dubai residents, tourists and other users. This will give the air facility the distinction of having the largest parking facility in the world. The former title belonged to West Edmonton Mall's 20,000 parking slot parking lot.

Al Maktoum International Airport

Al Maktoum International Airport  is a colossal new airport under construction near Jebel Ali, south of Dubai, in the United Arab Emirates. It will be the main part of Dubai World Central, a planned residential, commercial and logistics complex. Upon completion it will be the fourth largest air facility in land area (physical size). Only three other air facilities are larger than Dubai World Central: King Fahd International Airport, Dammam, Saudi Arabia, which is larger than the country of Bahrain, at 780 square kilometers; Montréal-Mirabel International Airport, Montreal, Quebec, Canada, at 392 square kilometers; and King Khalid International Airport, Riyadh, Saudi Arabia, at 225 square kilometers.

Due to the massive physical scale of the masterplan, others would come to claim that Dubai World Central would be the most ambitious airport project ever envisioned. The latest estimates by the government of Dubai peg the price tag at US$82 billion. This aerotropolis would be a whopping US$62 billion more expensive than the next most expensive airport project Hong Kong-Chek Lap Kok International Airport Core Project—which cost the Hong Kong government around US$20 billion (in 1997 dollars). This would also make it the most expensive single project in the world, ever (with the possible exceptions of the Dubai Waterfront, The Palm Deira, and New Songdo Intelligent City).

Global Village

Global Village is located in Dubailand, the world's largest tourism, leisure and entertainment project. Global Village is the region's first premier cultural, entertainment and shopping destination, celebrates diverse cultures, art, theatre, commerce and cuisine from around the world and welcomes more than four million guests per year.
Each season Global Village delivers a wide variety of pioneering new shows and attractions in the heart of Dubailand. It is completed now.

Culture Village

Culture Village is a multi-purpose development project, located along the shoreline of the Dubai creek on a  plot of land. When completed the village will include a harbour, cultural and exhibition centres, and dockside development. The center piece of this project is Palazzo Versace, the world's second after Palazzo Verasace of Queensland.

Dubai International Academic City

The project was launched in May 2006. The purpose of DAC is to be a base for schools, colleges and universities, By 2015, Dubai Academic city expects to have 40,000 students.

Dubai International City

Dubai International City is a country themed architecture of residences, business, and tourists attractions. Spreading over an area of 800 hectares (8 million square meters), the arrangement of the city is inspired by the traditional carpets of Middle East. Once completed, the project will contain studio, apartment and accommodate over 60 thousand residents.

Dubai Industrial City

It will be city within a city. When completed the development will include food and beverage zones, base-metal and transportation zones, Warehouses and an extensive conservation area. These areas are further complemented with logistics, educational and mixed use developments. It will be located near Jebel Ali International Airport along Emiartes Road. The city is expected to accommodate around 500,000 people when it is completed by 2015.

Dubai Pearl

Dubai Pearl is a complex under construction near Dubai Media City. It is estimated to cost $3 billion. The scheme will consist of four towers, each with 67 floors, with two podiums containing retail facilities and a four floors of car parking space. Three of the floors in the towers will contain 'sky homes'. The main investor is Al Fahim Family from Abu Dhabi. The Australian architects CK Designworks have completed work on the buildings.

Dubai Investment Park

Dubai Investment Park is a mixed used development project in Dubai, United Arab Emirates. When completed it will be 3,200 hectares in area or approximately 9 km inland from the persian gulf near the industrial park of Jebel Ali. Upon completion it will have industrial, business, residential, and recreational settlements. Dubai investment park will be constructed in phases, and only one phase is left for completion.

Jebel Ali Village

Jebel Ali Village is the re-development of the existing Jebel Ali Village. The existing Jebel Ali Village was constructed in 1977 to provide accommodation to expatriates. The construction on redevelopment of Jebel Ali Village had already begun in 2008, and was expected to be completed by 2013. The existing villas and tenants will be demolished which will give space for new ones. Jebel Ali Village upon completion will comprise commercial, community, and retail facilities, and the expansion of existing Central park to 12 hectares.

International Media Production zone (IMPZ)

The International Media Production Zone (IMPZ) is a free zone and freehold area that caters to media production companies. The Dubai government has plans to convert this area into the next generation of Dubai Media City.

Palm Islands

The Palm Islands  will be the three largest artificial islands in the world. The islands are The Palm Jumeirah, The Palm Jebel Ali and The Palm Deira. They were commissioned by Sheikh Mohammed bin Rashid Al Maktoum as a way to increase Dubai's tourism. Each island will have a large number of residential, leisure and entertainment centers and will add 520 km of beaches to the city. They are being constructed by Nakheel Properties.

Palm Jumeirah

The Palm Jumeirah consists of a 'trunk', 'crown', and a surrounding 'crescent' island that will forms an 11 kilometer-long breakwater. The island itself is 5 kilometers by 5 kilometers. It will add 78 kilometers to the Dubai coastline. The first phase of development created 4,000 residences. Residents began moving into the Palm Jumeirah properties by the end of 2006, five years after land reclamation began, according to project developer Nakheel Properties. This signaled the end of phase one of construction, which included approximately 1,400 villas on 11 of the fronds of the island and roughly 2,500 shoreline apartments in 20 buildings on the east side of the trunk. In the recent years, the island continued to develop big residency projects attracting local and foreign investors. Ellington Properties was one of the major developers on the island, totaling more than 1 million square ft in 6 separate projects

Al Habtoor City 

Al Habtoor City is a multi-use development consisting of three hotels (The St. Regis Dubai, The Westin, Al Habtoor City, W  Dubai – Al Habtoor City) and three high-rise residential towers commissioned by the Al Habtoor Group in 2012. Part of the Hotel Collection, The St. Regis Dubai was the first hotel to open in December 2015, the W Dubai – Al Habtoor City made its debut in June 2016  and The Westin Dubai, Al Habtoor City welcomed its first guests in August 2016.  Al Habtoor City stands on the site of one of Dubai's oldest hotels, the Metropolitan on Sheikh Zayed Road (E11 road).

Uptown Dubai 

Uptown Dubai is the project under construction in Dubai in 2017 DMCC proposed name Uptown Dubai Future of Dubai Uptown Tower The Plaza and Burj 2020 2nd tallest building in Dubai and United Arab Emirates, start construction in 2018 for World Trade Center in New York.

On-hold developments

Jumeirah Garden City

The master plan of Jumeirah Garden City refers to the redevelopment of a 9,000,000 (nine million) square meter land area, conceptualized to be a part of the 2015 strategic plan for Dubai. The development consists of 12 districts with an envision built up area of 14,000,000 (fourteen million) square meters. The Jumeirah garden city will aims to cater to a population of 50,000 to 60,000 residents. The project will cost approximately Dh350 billion (approx. $95bn). The announcement comes along with a global downturn that has shattered investor confidence worldwide, but goes on to show that Dubai is determined to continue with the vision of His Highness Sheikh Mohammad Bin Rashid Al Maktoum, Vice-President and Prime Minister of the UAE and Ruler of Dubai.

Trump International Hotel and Tower, Dubai

The Trump International Hotel and Tower was a proposed skyscraper hotel at the trunk of The Palm Jumeirah which was officially cancelled in 2011.

The World

The World is a man-made archipelago of 300 islands in the shape of a world map currently being built off the coast of Dubai, United Arab Emirates. The World is one of a series of artificial island projects in Dubai, along with the Palm Islands, and like the other islands The World is being built primarily using sand dredged from the sea. The World is the brainchild of Sheikh Mohammed bin Rashid Al Maktoum, the ruler of Dubai. As of November, 2009, only two of the hundreds of islands are completed, topped with a large house and many trees. All others remain barren, and very little construction equipment is in evidence.

Oqyana, The World 

OQYANA is an archipelago of artificial islands which make up the Australasian continent of The World development, off the coast of Dubai. The original plans were to have 14 islands (15 including the island occupying the position of Melanesia), which were assigned to the positions of Australia, New Zealand and New Guinea. The islands were purchased by The Investment Dar (a company based in Kuwait) and EFAD Holdings in late 2006. The name OQYANA is Arabic for Oceania.

Dubailand 

Dubailand part of Dubai Holding, is an entertainment complex under development in Dubai, United Arab Emirates. Construction of Dubailand has been divided into four phases. Work is currently being carried out on phase one. The first of four phases of the development of Dubailand will be completed in early 2008 since the developers decided to extend the park by 50% subsequently bumping up its completion date. Completion of the final phase is targeted for some time between 2015 and 2018 and is expected to be larger than Walt Disney World Resort. A few of the Dubailand facilities like the Dubai Autodrome and The Global Village are already operational.

Dubailand will include six zones (or worlds) under the banners of:
 Attractions & Experience World 13 km2 (5.2 mile²), which will include theme parks, The Global Village, Kids City, Giants World, Universal Studios Dubailand, Water Parks, and Dubai Snowdome (an indoor ski resort).
 Retail and Entertainment World 4 km2 (1.6 mile²), which will include a Flea Market, World Trade Park, Auction World, and Factory Outlets.
 Themed Leisure and Vacation World 29 km2 (11.2 mile²), which will include Women's World, Destination Dubai, Desert Kingdom, and Andalusian Resort and Spa.
 Eco-Tourism World 75 km2 (28.9 mile²), which will include Desert Safari, Sand Dune Hotel, Desert Camps, and Dubai Heritage Vision.
 Sports and Outdoor World 19 km2 (7.4 mile²), which will include Dubai Sports City, Dubai Golf City, Emerat Sports World, Plantation Equestrian and Polo Club and the Dubai Autodrome.
 Downtown 1.8 km2 (0.7 mile²), which will include the City of Arabia (Mall of Arabia, which will be the world's largest shopping mall), City Walk, the Great Dubai Wheel (a 185 m Ferris wheel), and Virtual Game World.

Bawadi, Dubailand 

Bawadi is a project announced by the government of the United Arab Emirates and other investors on 1 May 2006. The Bawadi master plan calls for a 10-km long boulevard in Dubai which will have 51 hotels and more than 60,000 rooms. One of the projects of this investment is the hotel resort Asia-Asia Hotel which will be the largest hotel in the world with more than 6,500 rooms. The development will have hotels along the strip that consist of Asian, Universal, The Americas, Middle Eastern, African, and European themes. Examples include the Wild Wild West Hotel for an American theme.

City of Arabia, Dubailand 

The City of Arabia is a small city within the walls of Dubailand. It will include one of the world's largest shopping centres, 34 commercial and residential towers, a dinosaur theme park, and a canal surrounded by residential and retail Middle Eastern-themed buildings.

Falconcity of Wonders

Falconcity of Wonders is a unique project both in terms of its components and magnitude. Occupying over 40,000,000 square feet, FCW hosts the seven wonders of the world, commercial centers, a signature theme park, family centers, sports facilities, educational institutes, in addition to more than 5,500 residential units that vary in design, location and size, to satisfy the needs and requirements of both, investors and end users.

Mall of Arabia 

Mall of Arabia will be a huge shopping mall to be built as part of City of Arabia in the Dubailand theme park premises in Dubai. It was announced by the Ilyas and Mustafa Galadari Group and it will include leisure and entertainment facilities, a theatre stage, and feature an ancient Middle Eastern exterior.

Palm Islands
The Palm Islands are some of the main attractions in Dubai.

Palm Jebel Ali

The Palm, Jebel Ali began construction in October 2002 and is expected to be completed in mid-2008. Once it has been completed it will be encircled by the Dubai Waterfront project. The project, which will be 50 percent larger than the Palm Jumeirah, will include six marinas, a water theme park, 'Sea Village', Busch Gardens, homes built on stilts above the water, and boardwalks that circle the "fronds" of the "palm".

Palm Deira

The Palm Deira was announced for development in October 2004 and completion is expected in 2015, when it will become the largest of the three Palm Islands with 41 fronds. Projections indicate that construction will consume over a billion cubic meters of rock and sand. It will consist of residential property, marinas, shopping malls, sports facilities, and clubs. The residential area will be located on the fronds and will contain 8,000 two-story town houses in three distinct styles - Premier Villas, Grand Villas and Vista Town Homes".

Hydropolis 

The Hydropolis Underwater Hotel and Resort was a planned hotel which should be the world's first underwater luxury resort.

The Universe (Dubai) 

The Universe is a set of islands that will be built off the coast of Dubai. They will form a cluster of islands in the shape of the Solar System. The Universe will have 3,000 hectares of land and will take 15 to 20 years to build. Nakheel, the same company building the Palm Islands and The World, will develop The Universe. The Universe will be located between the Palm Jumeirah, The World, the Jumeirah coast and the Palm Deira. The project, which was announced in January 2008, is still in the planning stages. It will be dredged by Van Oord, the same company used for The World, and the Palm Islands.

Dubai Waterfront 

The Dubai Waterfront is proposed to become the largest waterfront and largest man-made development in the world.  The project is a conglomeration of canals and artificial islands; it will occupy the last remaining Persian Gulf coastline of Dubai, the most populous emirate of the United Arab Emirates. It will consist of a series of zones with mixed use including commercial, residential, resort, and amenity areas.

Proposed developments

Mohammed Bin Rashid City

Mohammed Bin Rashid City is a planned mixed-use development. In November 2012 the ruler of Dubai Sheikh Mohammed bin Rashid Al Maktoum announced the establishment of what he termed a new "city" within Dubai. The complex is to contain four components:
 Family tourism, including a park able to receive 35 million visitors yearly, the largest family leisure and entertainment complex in the Middle East, Africa and Indian Subcontinent. The park is to be established in collaboration with Universal Studios and include more than 100 new hotels
 Retail, including the largest shopping mall in the world
 Arts, including the largest area for art galleries in the Middle East and North Africa
 Entrepreneurship and innovation

Drawings presented by the Sheikh in November 2012 show that the development covers all the empty land bordered by:
 Al Khail Road (E44) on the northwest
 D63 on the southwest/west
 Emirates Road (E311) on the south/southeast
 E66 on the east/northeast

In addition the complex is shown as including the Mohammad bin Rashid Gardens as well as the existing Downtown Dubai/Burj Khalifa and Business Bay developments.

Dynamic Tower

The Dynamic Tower (also known as Dynamic Architecture Building or the Da Vinci Tower) is a proposed , 80-floor tower in Dubai, United Arab Emirates.
Uniquely, each floor will be able to rotate independently. This will result in a constantly changing shape of the tower.

The Wave Tower

The Wave Tower is a proposed 92 floor supertall skyscraper for the Madinat Al Arab district of Dubai Waterfront in Dubai, United Arab Emirates designed by the Spanish architecture firm A-cero. It is planned to be 370 meters (1,214 ft) tall and is designed to be a green energy building.

Future developments

Dubai City Tower

The Dubai City Tower also known as the Dubai Vertical City is a proposed supertall skyscraper design announced on 25 August 2008. The supertall, created by an architect to display possibly future technologies, is the third tallest building ever fully envisioned after the X-Seed 4000 and Ultima Tower. If ever constructed, the Dubai City Tower will be much taller than any other current man-made structure. It would be nearly three times the height of the Burj Khalifa which is currently the tallest man-made structure ever built. The current design will have 400 floors and will be 2400 m tall.

See also
 List of development projects in Dubai
 List of buildings in Dubai
 List of tallest buildings in Dubai
 Dubai Multi Commodities Centre
 Burj Khalifa
 List of cities with most skyscrapers
 Land reclamation in the UAE
 Timeline of Dubai

References

Economy of Dubai
Buildings and structures in Dubai
Architecture in Dubai
Urban planning in the United Arab Emirates